Monia Baccaille (born 10 April 1984 in Marsciano) is an Italian professional cyclist. She competed at the 2012 Summer Olympics in the Women's road race, but finished over the time limit.

Notable results

2005
 Tour of Flanders for Women (3rd)
2006
 Coppa de Laghi (1st)
 Trophée d'Or Féminin (1 stage, 3rd overall)
2008
 Grand Prix Elsy Jacobs (1st)
2009
  Italian National Road Race Championships (1st)
2010
 Grand Prix Elsy Jacobs (2nd)
  Italian National Road Race Championships (1st)
 GP Liberazione (1st)
2011
 Tour of Chongming Island (3rd)
 Ladies Tour of Qatar (1st stage 3)
 GP de Dottignies (2nd)

2012
 Tour of Chongming Island (2nd overall, 1st stage 2)
 Tour of Chongming Island World Cup (3rd)
 GP de Dottignies (1st)

2014 – Alé Cipollini 2014 season

External links
 
 
 

1984 births
Living people
People from Marsciano
Italian female cyclists
Cyclists at the 2012 Summer Olympics
Olympic cyclists of Italy
Cyclists from Umbria
Italian track cyclists
Sportspeople from the Province of Perugia
21st-century Italian women